The Women's 500 m speed skating competition for the 2002 Winter Olympics was held in Salt Lake City, Utah, United States. The competition consisted of two separate 500 metre races, with the competitors ranked by their cumulative time from the two races.

World record holder Catriona Le May Doan retained her Olympic title by beating four-time World Sprint Champion Monique Garbrecht-Enfeldt.

Records

Prior to this competition, the existing world and Olympic records were as follows.

500 meters (1 race)

The following new world and Olympic records were set during this competition.

Results

References

Women's speed skating at the 2002 Winter Olympics
Women's events at the 2002 Winter Olympics